Fred Horn (June 26, 1925 – December 7, 2018) was an American politician who served in the Alabama House of Representatives from 1978 to 1986 and in the Alabama Senate from the 18th district from 1990 to 1994.

He died on December 7, 2018, in Birmingham, Alabama at age 93.

References

1925 births
2018 deaths
Democratic Party members of the Alabama House of Representatives
Democratic Party Alabama state senators